= Winterville, Virginia =

Unincorporated community in Virginia, United States

Coordinates: 37°50′18″N 75°38′31″W

Winterville is an unincorporated community in Accomack County, Virginia, United States.
